The FIBT World Championships 1983 took place in Lake Placid, New York, United States for the sixth time, hosting the event previously in 1949, 1961, 1969, 1973, and 1978.

Two man bobsleigh

Four man bobsleigh

Medal table

References
2-Man bobsleigh World Champions
4-Man bobsleigh World Champions

IBSF World Championships
International sports competitions hosted by the United States
Sports in Lake Placid, New York
1983 in bobsleigh
Bobsleigh in the United States 
1983 in American sports